Suchkov (from сучок meaning wood knot) is a Russian masculine surname, its feminine counterpart is Suchkova. It may refer to
Aleksandr Suchkov (born 1980), Russian football player
Alexei Soutchkov (born 1966), Russian pianist
Alyaksey Suchkow (born 1981), Belarusian football midfielder 
Pavel Suchkov (born 1992), Russian ice hockey goaltender

Russian-language surnames